The Last Resort is a role-playing game adventure published by TSR in 1985 for the Marvel Super Heroes role-playing game.

Contents
The Last Resort is a scenario in which the West Coast Avengers run into trouble at a resort in the Rockies.

Publication history
MH7 The Last Resort was written by Kim Eastland, with a cover by Ron Frenz, and was published by TSR, Inc., in 1985 as a 16-page book, a large color map, and an outer folder.

Reception

Reviews

References

Marvel Comics role-playing game adventures
Role-playing game supplements introduced in 1985